The South Australian Research and Development Institute (SARDI) is the principal research institute of the Government of South Australia, with a network of research centres, laboratories and field sites both in metropolitan Adelaide and throughout South Australia. SARDI is part of Primary Industries and Regions SA.

Head Office 
The SARDI Head Office is located in the Waite Research Precinct, along with CSIRO, the University of Adelaide's Waite Campus, and others, in the Adelaide suburb of Urrbrae, South Australia.

Metropolitan sites

Plant Research Centre
The Plant Research Centre is located in the Waite Research Precinct, along with CSIRO,  the University of Adelaide's Waite Campus, and other research and educational establishments, in the Adelaide suburb of Urrbrae, South Australia.

Plant Research Centre research capabilities:
 Climate Applications and Adaptation
 Entomology and Plant Pathology
 Field Crops and New Variety Agronomy
 Molecular Diagnostics and Root Disease Centre
 Viticulture
 Feed and Forage
 Food Safety and Innovation 
 Plant & Soil Health
 Water Resources & Irrigated Crops

North Arm Store, Gillman
Located in the suburb of Gillman, South Australia.

Is the main mooring of the Research Vessel Ngerin which provides Aquatic Sciences Research Support

South Australian Aquatic Sciences Centre (SAASC) 
The SAASC is located in the beachside suburb of West Beach, South Australia.

Research capabilities:
 Aquaculture
 Oceanography
 Fisheries
 Inland Waters & Catchment Ecology
 Marine Ecosystems
 Animal Health and Biosecurity

Country sites

Clare Crop Improvement Centre 
Located in the town of Clare, South Australia.

Research capabilities:
 Field Crops

Lenswood Agricultural Centre 
Located in the town of Lenswood, South Australia.

Research capabilities:
 Plant & Soil Health

Loxton Research Centre 
Located in the town of Loxton, South Australia.

Research capabilities:
..............................................................................
 Sustainable Systems
 Water Resources & Irrigated Crops

Minnipa Research Centre 
The Minnipa Research Centre is located in the town of Minnipa, South Australia.

Research capabilities:
 Farming Systems

Mount Gambier Aquatic Sciences  
Located in the city of Mount Gambier, South Australia.

Research capabilities:
 Wild Fisheries

Nuriootpa Research Centre
Located in the town of Nuriootpa, South Australia.

Research capabilities:
 Viticulture

Port Lincoln Marine Science Centre (LMSC)
The LMSC is located on Boston Bay in the city of Port Lincoln, South Australia.

Research capabilities:
 Aquaculture
 Marine Ecosystesm
 Fisheries

Port Lincoln Crop Improvement Centre
Located in the city of Port Lincoln, South Australia.

Research capabilities:
 Crop Improvement

Roseworthy Campus
Located in the JS Davies Building on the Roseworthy Campus, co-located with University of Adelaide#Roseworthy, outside the town of Roseworthy, South Australia.

Research capabilities:
 Marine Biosecurity
 Farming Systems
 Pigs and Poultry
 Animal Reproduction
 Animal Welfare

Struan Research Centre
The Struan Research Centre is located at Struan, between the towns of Penola, South Australia and Naracoorte, South Australia.

Research capabilities:
 Feed and Forage
 Sheep and Beef Meat

Turretfield Research Centre

The Turretfield Research Centre is located at Rosedale, South Australia.

Research capabilities:
 Animal Reproduction
 Pastures
 Oats Breeding

See also
Network of Aquaculture Centres in Asia-Pacific

References
SARDI sites, sardi.sa.gov.au
SARDI Research Centres & Facilities, sardi.sa.gov.au

External links
 http://www.sardi.sa.gov.au

Scientific organisations based in Australia
Research institutes in Australia
Government agencies of South Australia
Agricultural research institutes in Australia